The Pay-Off is a 1926 American silent drama film directed by Dell Henderson and starring Robert McKim, Marcella Daly and  Charles Delaney.

Synopsis
A young woman and her father need a dam built on their property, but encounter difficulties which unknown to them are being caused by a financier they have encountered.

Cast
 Robert McKim as The Financier
 Marcella Daly as The Young Woman 
 Charles Delaney as 	The Young Man
 Otis Harlan as The Young Woman's Father

References

Bibliography
 Connelly, Robert B. The Silents: Silent Feature Films, 1910-36, Volume 40, Issue 2. December Press, 1998.
 Munden, Kenneth White. The American Film Institute Catalog of Motion Pictures Produced in the United States, Part 1. University of California Press, 1997.

External links
 

1926 films
1926 drama films
1920s English-language films
American silent feature films
Silent American drama films
American black-and-white films
Films directed by Dell Henderson
1920s American films